INS Sindhuvijay (S62) (Victory at Sea) is a  diesel-electric submarine of the Indian Navy.

References

Sindhughosh-class submarines
Attack submarines
Ships built in the Soviet Union
Ships built in Russia
1990 ships
Submarines of India